JB DeRosa (born April 14, 1991) is an American professional basketball referee for the Cleveland Cavaliers of the National Basketball Association (NBA), wearing number 62. As of the 2020-21 NBA season DeRosa has officiated 192 regular-season games and one playoff game. He is in his fifth season as an NBA referee. DeRosa is the son of former NBA official Joe DeRosa.

Early life
DeRosa was born on April 14, 1991, in Paducah, Kentucky. He graduated from GlenOak High School in Plain Township, Ohio.

Officiating career
At 13-years-old DeRosa began his officiating career by refereeing local CYO and local recreational leagues in the Canton, Ohio, area. He officiated women's college basketball from 2009 to 2013 and men's college basketball from 2014 to 2017. DeRosa spent five seasons officiating for the NBA G League, where he worked the NBA G League Finals in 2016 and 2017. As of the 2020-21 NBA season DeRosa has officiated 192 regular-season games and one playoff game. He is in his fifth season as an NBA referee. On January 2, 2023, he officiated a game in which Donavon Mitchell scored 71 points against the Chicago Bulls.

Personal life
DeRosa resides in Canton, Ohio. He graduated from Malone University in 2013.

References

External links
National Basketball Referees Association bio

1991 births
Living people
Basketball people from Kentucky
Basketball people from Ohio
Sportspeople from Paducah, Kentucky
Sportspeople from Canton, Ohio
Malone University alumni
College men's basketball referees in the United States
National Basketball Association referees
NBA G League referees